Stefan Jakimov Dedov (28 October 1869 – 19 September 1914) was a journalist, writer and early proponent of the Macedonian Slavs' ethnonational distinctiveness. He expressed publicly the idea of a Macedonian nation distinct from Bulgarians, as well as a separate Macedonian language. Though, he self-identified occasionally as a Bulgarian too.

Biography  
Dedov was born in Ohrid in 1869, in the then Ottoman Empire. There he worked as a teacher before becoming a postal worker in Berkovica and Ruse. In 1898, he moved to Belgrade, where he began studying at the Faculty of Law (1898-1902). Тhere he, along with Dijamandija Mišajkov, founded the "Macedonian club", and published the newspaper Balkanski glasnik (Balkan herald) in French and Serbian. The newspaper expressed the idea for an independent Macedonian state, nation and language. Later the Serbian government banned the club and suppressed the newspaper.

In 1902, he went to Saint Petersburg together with Mišajkov and became one of the founders of Macedonian Scientific and Literary Society in October 1902. Along with Mišajkov, the next month, he sent a memorandum to the Russian government calling for Macedonian autonomy, recognition of Macedonian Slavs as a distinct ethnic group and a distinct Macedonian Slavic language, as well as an independent church, among other things.

Dedov went to Sofia in 1903 and published the newspaper Balkan. There he espoused pro-Bulgarian views in his publications. However he also aided Krste Petkov Misirkov in the printing of On Macedonian Matters and created a branch of the Macedonian Scientific and Literary Society with him on 23 November, but it was disbanded by the Bulgarian police after two days.

In 1904 he published the newspaper Kurier (Courier). He was a contributor for the Den (Day) and Balkanski Kurier (Balkan Courier) newspapers, mostly under the pseudonym Ridski or R. Dedov cooperated with some Internal Macedonian Revolutionary Organization activists, though he was suspected of being a pro-Serbian activist by the organization. He was killed in 1914 by an associate of Todor Aleksandrov - Slave Ivanov. Reporting on his death, the Belgrade newspaper Politika described him as a "honorary Serbian commercial agent".

His son, Evtim Dedov was a prominent Bulgarian sports journalist, director of the Levski sports newspaper and general secretary of the "Levski" Sport Club.

References 

People from Ohrid
1869 births
1914 deaths
People murdered in Bulgaria
Early Macedonists
Macedonian writers
Bulgarian journalists
Macedonian Scientific and Literary Society